The National Autonomous University of Mexico (Universidad Nacional Autónoma de México (UNAM)), is the large public autonomous university, and it is based in Mexico City. 
National University of Misiones, a National University in Posadas, Argentina
Club Universidad Nacional, or UNAM, a soccer club based in Mexico City, better known as Pumas de la UNAM
University of Namibia,  a university in Windhoek, Namibia
 Unam Sanctam, a bull issued on 18 November 1302 by Pope Boniface VIII